The Oracle Enterprise Metadata Manager (EMM) is a product of the Oracle Corporation that provides an ISO/IEC 11179 metadata registry.

Strategic nature of a metadata registry
This product is significant because it is one of the first commercial products that includes a metadata registry in an application server.  Registering metadata is one of the first steps in metadata publishing which in turn is one of the foundational elements of the Semantic Web.

Oracle product editions 
EMM currently runs on the following Oracle products
 Oracle Enterprise Edition
 8.1.7
 9i
 Release 1
 Release 2
 Oracle 9iAS
 Version 1.0.2.2.2

EMM is being ported to Oracle 9iAS Release 2 and 10gAS .

See also
 ISO/IEC 11179
 Metadata registry
 Oracle metadata

External links
http://www.oracle.com/us/products/middleware/data-integration/enterprise-metadata-management/overview/index.html

ISO/IEC 11179